Settlement geography is a branch of human geography that investigates the earth's surface's part settled by humans. According to the United Nations' Vancouver Declaration on Human Settlements (1976), "human settlements means the totality of the human community – whether city, town or village – with all the social, material, organizational, spiritual and cultural elements that sustain it."

Classification 

Traditionally, it belongs to cultural geography and is divided into the geography of urban settlements (cities and towns) and rural settlements (e.g. villages and hamlets). Thereby, settlements are mostly seen as elements of the cultural landscape that developed over time. Apart from Australia, Europe and India, the term is actually rarely used in English-speaking geography. One of the last English books on settlement geography was published by Cambridge University Press in the 1990s. However, it is a traditional and actual branch in many other countries (e.g., German Siedlungsgeographie, French Geographie de l'habitat, Italian Geografia insediativa, Polish Geografia osadnictwa).

Actuality 

Due to processes of urban sprawl such as counter urbanization, peri-urbanisation or postsuburbanisation the existing dichotomy between the urban and the rural is losing importance, especially in industrialized countries and newly industrialized countries. This point of view is already represented by many planning strategies such as  unified settlement planning. Hence, an integrative geography of settlements that considers the urban and the rural settlements as a continuum is regaining the importance lost during the 20th century. Further it is used in prehistoric, historic and present-focusing  geographic research.

Definitions 

Referring to Stone (1960), settlement geography is 

With respect to Stone's definition, Jordan (1966) emphasizes that settlement geography not exclusively investigates the distributions, but even more the structures, processes and interactions between settlements and its environment (such as soil, geomorphology, economy or society), which produce them. More recently, however,

In sum, settlement geography describes and explains the settlements' location, substance, form and structure, as well as the functions and processes that produced them over time (Genesis, from Greek γέννησις, "origin, birth" or historical development). As an applied science, it projects future settlement development and contributes to the sustainable development of human-environmental systems.

See also 
 Circles of Sustainability
 Human settlement
 Sustainable development
 UN-HABITAT
 Urban geography

References 

 
Human geography
Urban planning